Fred Matua (January 14, 1984 – August 5, 2012) was an American football guard. After playing college football for Southern California, he was drafted by the Detroit Lions in the seventh round of the 2006 NFL Draft. He was a member of the Lions, Tennessee Titans, Cleveland Browns, Washington Redskins, Florida Tuskers, and Omaha Nighthawks in his career.

High school career
Born in Wilmington, California, Matua prepped at Banning High School in Wilmington, California where he won the 2000 LA City 4A Championship his junior year.

College career
While playing college football for the USC Trojans, Matua was an All-American guard in 2005.

Professional career

NFL
He was drafted on the second day by the National Football League's Detroit Lions but was cut by the team and was signed to the Tennessee Titans practice squad.  On October 28, 2006, he was signed to the Cleveland Browns roster.

Florida Tuskers
Matua was signed by the Florida Tuskers of the United Football League on September 3, 2009.

Death 

On August 5, 2012, Matua died at the age of 28 of a heart-related issue.

References

External links
Detroit Lions bio
USC Trojans bio

1984 births
2012 deaths
American sportspeople of Samoan descent
Players of American football from Los Angeles
American football offensive guards
USC Trojans football players
Detroit Lions players
Tennessee Titans players
Cleveland Browns players
Washington Redskins players
Florida Tuskers players
Omaha Nighthawks players
People from Wilmington, Los Angeles